Scotland is a town in Windham County, Connecticut. As of the 2020 census, the town population was 1,576. Scotland is a predominantly rural town with agriculture as the principal industry. Scotland is the least populated town in Windham County.

Geography
According to the U.S. Census Bureau, the town has a total area of 18.7 square miles (48.3 km), of which, 18.6 square miles (48.2 km) of it is land and 0.1 square miles (0.1 km) of it (0.27%) is water. It was incorporated in 1857.

History
In 1700, Isaac Magoon purchased  of land from then Windham and thus began Scotland's History. He named the town Scotland as a way of commemorating his ancestral home. Scotland was incorporated in May 1857.

Government
The town still maintains the town meeting as its form of government with a board of selectmen. The town also has eight boards & commissions, including Inlands & Wetlands, Planning & Zoning and Board of Education.

Education 
Scotland Elementary School, located on Brook Road, serves grades Pre-K–6 for the town, which is part of Regional School District 11.

Attractions
Scotland is home to the D'Elia Antique Tool Museum, a museum built in 2005 and housed in the same building as the Scotland Public Library. It is the home of over 1200 antique woodworking planes dating back to the mid-18th century. A second attraction is the Samuel Huntington Birthplace, birthplace of Samuel Huntington, a Founding Father, located on Huntington Road or CT Route 14.

Transportation 
CT Route 14 passes east–west through the town. Route 97 goes north–south through the town. The Providence and Worcester Railroad runs through the south-western part of the town, but doesn't stop.

On the National Register of Historic Places
 March Route of Rochambeau's Army: Palmer Road – Palmer Road, from intersection with Miller Road to East of junction with Pudding Hill Road (added July 6, 2003)
 Edward Waldo House – Waldo Rd., intersects with Route 97 (added 1978)

Demographics

At the 2020 census there were 1,576 people, 553 households, and 425 families living in the town. The racial makeup of the town was 97.69% White, 0.45% African American, 0.06% Native American, 0.51% Asian, 0.19% Pacific Islander, 0.51% from other races, and 0.58% from two or more races. Hispanic or Latino of any race were 2.31%.

Of the 553 households 37.4% had children under the age of 18 living with them, 67.5% were married couples living together, 6.9% had a female householder with no husband present, and 23.0% were non-families. 15.7% of households were one person and 4.9% were one person aged 65 or older.  The average household size was 2.81 and the average family size was 3.16.

The age distribution was 28.2% under the age of 18, 5.9% from 18 to 24, 31.7% from 25 to 44, 25.3% from 45 to 64, and 8.9% 65 or older.  The median age was 37 years. For every 100 females, there were 100.8 males.  For every 100 females age 18 and over, there were 98.0 males.

The median household income was $56,848 and the median family income  was $60,147. Males had a median income of $40,871 versus $29,830 for females. The per capita income for the town was $22,573.  About 4.0% of families and 4.7% of the population were below the poverty line, including 4.7% of those under age 18 and 10.9% of those age 65 or over.

Notable people

 Samuel Huntington (1731–1796) a leading American Patriot during the American Revolution and a Founding Father and delegate to the Second Continental Congress in Philadelphia, where he signed the Declaration of Independence

References

External links
Official Scotland website

1857 establishments in Connecticut
 
Scottish-American history
Towns in Connecticut
Towns in Windham County, Connecticut